O'Dempsey's GAA is a Gaelic football club located in the northeast of County Laois, Ireland.

History
The club was founded in 1951, won the Laois Junior Football Championship title in that same year and followed up by winning the Laois Intermediate Football Championship title the following year. The club name refers to the Ó Díomasaigh (O'Dempsey) family, the ancient Gaelic rulers of the Clann Mhaolughra (Clanmaliere) region, incorporating Portnahinch and Upper Philipstown on both sides of the River Barrow.

O'Dempsey's went on to win two Laois Senior Football Championship titles in 1963 and 1980.

Locally well-known county players that have played for the club Include John Costello, Billy Walsh, John Paul Kehoe, Johnny Behan, Brian Nerney, Eddie Kelly,  Jack Kenna, Mick Aherne, Leo Turley and Peter O'Leary.    

O'Dempsey's GAA club grounds are located at the Old Pound, halfway between Ballybrittas and Killenard.

Achievements
 Laois Senior Football Championship: (2) 1963, 1980
 Laois Intermediate Football Championship: (3) 1952, 1977, 2016
 Laois Junior Football Championships: (2) 1951, 2019
 Laois Junior B Football Championship: (2) 1992, 2009
 Laois Junior C Football Championship: (1) 2011
 Laois Minor Football Championship: (2) 1980, 1997
 Laois Minor B Football Championship: (5) 1983, 1984, 1990, 2014, 2015
 Laois Under 21 Football Championship: (1) 1973
 Laois Under 21 B Football Championship: (2) 2010, 2014
 Laois All-County Football League Div. 1: (4) 1990, 2006, 2017, 2018
 Laois All-County Football League Div. 2: (1) 2010
 Laois All-County Football League Div. 4: (1) 2012
 Laois All-County Football League Div. 5: (1) 2010

Notable players
 Shane Nerney
 Robbie Kehoe
 Peter O'Leary
 Stephen O'Leary
 Conor Meredith
 John Paul Kehoe
 Johnny Behan
 Jay Keogh

References

Gaelic games clubs in County Laois
Gaelic football clubs in County Laois